Snooze may refer to:

 Sleep, a naturally recurring state of reduced consciousness and inactivity, especially:
 Nap, a short period of sleep
 Snooze (album), a 1996 album by American pianist Joanne Brackeen
 "Snooze" (The Goodies), an episode of the British television series The Goodies
 Snooze (musician) or Dominique Dalcan (born 1964), French electronic musician and composer
 Snooze button, a common feature of an alarm clock
 "Snooze", a  song by SZA from her 2022 album SOS